Vladimir Vladimirovich Mirzoyev (born October 21, 1957) is a Soviet and Russian film director, set designer and teacher. Winner of State Prize of the Russian Federation.

Biography
Vladimir was born on October 21, 1957. He studied at Russian Institute of Theatre Arts as a circus director. Since 1987 to 1989 he was the artistic director of the Domino Theater. In 1990 he founded the Horizontal Eight theater company in Toronto, then he staged various performances, taught and conducted master classes.

Filmography (selected)
 The Man Who Knew Everything (2009)
 Boris Godunov (2011)
 Her Name Was Mumu (2015)
 How Nadya Went to Get Vodka (2020)

Awards
 State Prize of the Russian Federation in the field of literature and arts (2002)
  in the category "Best Series Director" (2022)

References

External links 
 
 Vladimir Mirzoyev on kino-teatr.ru

1957 births
Living people
20th-century Russian screenwriters
Male screenwriters
20th-century Russian male writers
21st-century Russian screenwriters
State Prize of the Russian Federation laureates
Russian film directors
Russian scenic designers
Russian theatre directors
Soviet theatre directors
Russian activists against the 2022 Russian invasion of Ukraine
Russian Academy of Theatre Arts alumni
Soviet emigrants to Canada